Berthen (in Dutch: Berten), located at the foot of Mont des Cats, is a commune in the Nord department in northern France.

Population

Church of St Blaise

The ancient church dated from 1589. The church and village was destroyed on 28 May 1940 by German bombing.

The new church was begun in 1961 to the plans of the architect E.-M. Thibault and consecrated 12 July 1964. The new church retains the profile of the old. Claude Blanchet's windows show the Passion.

Heraldry

See also
Communes of the Nord department

References

Communes of Nord (French department)
French Flanders